Charles Brand (16 June 1916 – July 1984) was a British water polo player. He competed at the 1948 Summer Olympics and the 1952 Summer Olympics.

References

1916 births
1984 deaths
British male water polo players
Olympic water polo players of Great Britain
Water polo players at the 1948 Summer Olympics
Water polo players at the 1952 Summer Olympics
People from Chorlton-cum-Hardy
British Army personnel of World War II
Royal Army Ordnance Corps soldiers
Military personnel from Manchester